Hapalomys is a genus of rodent in the family Muridae endemic to Southeast Asia. It is the only member of the tribe Hapalomyini. 
It contains the following species:
 Delacour's marmoset rat (Hapalomys delacouri)
 Marmoset rat (Hapalomys longicaudatus)
 Suntsov's marmoset rat (Hapalomys suntsovi), a Vietnamese endemic recently described from Binh Phuoc Province, southern Vietnam 
†Hapalomys gracilis (fossil species)

References

 
Rodent genera
Taxa named by Edward Blyth
Taxonomy articles created by Polbot